Ana Patrícia da Costa Barros (born February 16, 1993) is an Angolan handball player. She plays for the club Petro Atlético, and on the Angolan national team. She competed for the Angolan team at the 2012 Summer Olympics in London.

References

External links
 

Angolan female handball players
1993 births
Living people
Handball players at the 2012 Summer Olympics
Olympic handball players of Angola